The BSN Most Valuable Player (Jugador Más Valioso) is an annual most valuable player award of Puerto Rico's top-tier level professional basketball league, the Baloncesto Superior Nacional (BSN), that is given to the best performing player of the regular season. The award is decided by a panel of local sportswriters and broadcasters, each of whom casts votes. As of August 2018, the current holder of the award is Reyshawn Terry, of the Piratas de Quebradillas.

Juan "Pachín" Vicéns, Teófilo Cruz, and Mario "Quijote" Morales won the award a record four times. Juan Báez, Raymond Dalmau, Georgie Torres, and Christian Dalmau won the BSN Most Valuable Player award three times.

Winners

Multi-time winners

See also 
 Baloncesto Superior Nacional (BSN)
 List of BSN champions

References

External links
Puerto Rican League official website 

Baloncesto Superior Nacional
Basketball in Puerto Rico